Friedrich Kurrent (10 September 1931 – 10 January 2022) was an Austrian architect and author.

Biography
He was a professor at the Technical University of Munich and a member of the Bayerische Akademie der Schönen Künste. Kurrent died on 10 January 2022, at the age of 90.

Works
 in Salzburg (1956)
 in Steyr (1961)
 in Aigen (1964)
 in Floridsdorf (1974)
Wohnhaus Nobilegasse in Vienna (1987)
Kino Liliom in Augsburg (1989)
Bergkapelle in Ramingstein (1991)
Wohnturm in Krems an der Donau (1995)
Evangelische Segenskirche in Aschheim (1997)
Katholische Pfarrkirche Sankt Laurentius in Kirchham (1998)
 in Sommerein (2004)

Awards
 (1979)
Austrian Decoration for Science and Art (1997)
Decoration of Honour for Services to the Republic of Austria (2017)

References

1931 births
2022 deaths
Austrian architects
Modernist architects
Austrian architecture writers
Academic staff of the Technical University of Munich
People from Salzburg